This is a list of music festivals in Australia, including festivals that have stopped running.

A-E 
Adelaide Guitar Festival 
 Alternative Nation Festival
 Australian Festival of Chamber Music
 Australian Gospel Music Festival
 Bassinthedust
 Bassinthegrass
 Bendigo Blues and Roots Music Festival
 Beyond The Valley
 Big Day Out - national - from 1992
 Byron Bay Bluesfest
 Break the Ice
 Camp Doogs
 Canberra Country Music Festival
 Castlemaine State Festival
 CoastFest
 Come Together Music Festival
 Corinbank Festival
 Creamfields Australia
 Darwin International Guitar Festival
 Defqon.1 Festival
 Dingo Creek Jazz & Blues Festival
 Distorted Music Festival
 Earthcore
 Easterfest
 Electrofringe

F-L 
 Fairbridge Festival
 Falls Festival
 Festival Of The Sun
 Greener Pastures
 Global Gathering
 Golden Plains
 Gone South
 Good Things
 The Grass is Greener
 Groovin The Moo
 Gympie Muster
 The Great Escape
 Homebake
 Invasion Fest
 Listen Out
 Live at the Zoo
 Livid

M-O

 Melbourne International Jazz Festival
 Meredith Music Festival
 List of Meredith Music Festival lineups by year
 Metal For The Brain
 Mildura Country Music Festival
 Moomba
 Mountain Sounds (festival)
 MS Fest
 Nannup Music Festival
 Narara Music Festival
 No Sleep Til Festival
 Odysee (Wallacia) Pop Festival 1971
 Offshore Festival

P-T

 Parklife Festival
 Party In The Paddock PITP
 Peats Ridge Festival
 Pilgrimage For Pop 1970 Ourimbah
 Planetshakers
 Port Fairy Folk Festival
 Primary Schools Music Festival
 Pyramid Rock Festival
 Queensland Music Festival
 Rainbow Serpent Festival
 Raggamuffin Music Festival
 Red Hot Summer Tour
 Rewind 80s Festival Australia
 Rock-It Festival
 Rock Isle (Mulwala) Festival 1972
 Rollercoaster
 Sonfest
 SoundFest
 Soundwave Festival
 Southbound
 Southern Roots Festival
 Spilt Milk (festival)
 Splendour in the Grass
 St Jerome's Laneway Festival
 Stereosonic
 Stompen Ground
 Stonefest
 Subsonic Music Festival
 Summadayze
 Summersault
Sunbury music festival
Sydney Eisteddfod
 Sydney Intervarsity Choral Festival (SIV)
 Taste of Chaos
 Tamworth Country Music Festival
 The Grass Is Greener (festival) 
Torch Fest
 Triple J's One Night Stand

U
Umbrella: Winter City Sounds (Adelaide) 
 Unify
 Ultra Music Festival

V-Z
 V Festival (Australia)
 Village Fair
 Vivid LIVE
 Wandong Country Music Festival
 Wangaratta Festival of Jazz
 West Coast Blues & Roots Festival
 Woodford Folk Festival
 WOMADelaide
 Yarrapay Festival
 Yours and Owls

See also
 List of festivals in Australia

References

External links 
 myFestivals App - Calendar of Australian Festivals

Music festivals, List of Australian
 
Australia
Lists of music festivals in Oceania